The 2007-08 Plus Pujol Lleida season is their 5th season in the Adecco LEB Oro.

Game log

September
Record: 1–1; Home: 0–1; Road: 1–0

October
Record: 3–1; Home: 2–0; Road: 1–1

November
Record: 2–2; Home: 1–1; Road: 1–1

December
Record: 3–1; Home: 2–0; Road: 1–1

January
Record: 0–3; Home: 0–1; Road: 0–2

February
Record: 3–1; Home: 2–0; Road: 1–1

March
Record: 3-3; Home: 2-1; Road: 1-2

April
Record: 3-1; Home: 1-1; Road: 2-0

May
Record: 1-2; Home: 0-2; Road: 1-0

Playoffs

Game log

Player stats

Regular season and play off

2007–08 in Spanish basketball
2007–08 in European basketball by club